Siyo Zunapio (born 15 March 1988) is a Democratic Republic of Congolese football player who last played for Brothers Union in the Bangladesh Premier League.

Club career

Youth years
Siyo Zunapio Jeancy started playing while at primary school. As a youth he also played at various age levels for now DC Virunga.

Early career
In 2005, he joined DC Virunga FC, the same year that his friend Sina was signed with rayon sport then playing in Linafoot.

Simba SC
At the end of 2009, he moved to Tanzania club Simba, turning down trial offers from Swedish clubs. He won KAGAME CUP CECA FA with Simba SC.

Farashganj SC
At the end of January 2010, he moved to Bangladesh Farashganj SC on that year he proved to be a valuable player and was handed the captain armband as the first foreigner to be give the armband he managed to lead the team to its first silver ware in the club history

Egs Gafsa

Al najma benghazi
At the beginning of the year 2013 Al najma benghazi, Siyo signed a loan deal with Al najma benghazi until 11 November 2014.

Al-Mojzel Club
On 4 June 2014,he agreed to a one-year contract with the Sudanese giants Al mojzel.

Churchill Brothers
In February 2018 he joined Churchill Brothers of I-League as a replacement for injured Mechac Koffi.

Rahmatganj MFS
On 1 November 2019, He joined Rahmatganj MFS in Bangladesh Football Premier League.

Brothers Union
On 1 December 2020, He joined Brothers Union in Bangladesh Football Premier League.

On 26 December 2020, He scored his first goal for Brothers Union in 2020–21 Bangladesh Federation Cup.

Honours

Club
Farashganj SC
 Independence Cup: 2011

References

External links
http://allafrica.com/stories/201410170866.html
FIFA.com
http://www.thedailystar.net/sports/football/feni-take-relegation-fight-playoff-1338466
 
 
 

Living people
Churchill Brothers FC Goa players
1988 births
Democratic Republic of the Congo footballers
Democratic Republic of the Congo expatriate footballers
I-League players
Expatriate footballers in Libya
Expatriate footballers in Bangladesh
Expatriate footballers in Tanzania
Expatriate footballers in India
Association football forwards
Farashganj SC players